Bombus amurensis is a bumblebee belonging to the subgenus Subterraneobombus, first described by Radoszkowski in 1862. It lives primarily in China, Mongolia and the far south-east of Russia.

Appearance
Bombus amurensis has short black hair on its head (but with a mixture of yellow hair in males), yellow on the upper part of the body except for a ring -shaped black spot in the middle between the wing brackets, and yellow even to the rear body.

References

Bumblebees